Isaiah Johnson (born December 20, 1995) is an American football cornerback who is currently a free agent. He played college football at Houston.

Early years
Johnson attended James Earl Rudder High School in Bryan, Texas. He committed to the University of Houston to play college football.

College career
Johnson played at Houston from 2014 to 2018. He spent his first two years as a wide receiver before switching to cornerback prior to his junior year in 2017. During his two years as a receiver, he had 21 receptions for 208 yards. In his two years as a cornerback, he had 115 tackles and four interceptions.

Professional career

Oakland / Las Vegas Raiders
Johnson was drafted by the Oakland Raiders in the fourth round (129th overall) of the 2019 NFL Draft. He was placed on injured reserve on September 2, 2019. He was designated for return and began practicing again on October 14. He was activated on November 4.

On November 8, 2020, Johnson forced two incomplete passes on the last two plays of the game to seal the team's 31–26 win over the Los Angeles Chargers. In Week 10 against the Denver Broncos, Johnson was ejected from the game after punching Broncos' wide receiver Tim Patrick after Patrick punched Johnson's teammate Johnathan Abram. He was placed on the reserve/COVID-19 list by the team on November 18, and activated three days later. He was placed back on the COVID-19 list on December 19, 2020, and activated on December 23.

On August 31, 2021, Johnson was waived by the Raiders.

Dallas Cowboys
On October 5, 2021, Johnson was signed to the Dallas Cowboys practice squad. He was released on October 19.

Pittsburgh Steelers
On December 14, 2021, Johnson was signed to the Pittsburgh Steelers practice squad. He was released on December 20.

Arizona Cardinals
On December 29, 2021, Johnson was signed to the Arizona Cardinals practice squad. He was released on January 4, 2022.

Pittsburgh Steelers (second stint)
On January 19, 2022, Johnson signed a reserve/future contract with the Pittsburgh Steelers. He was waived/injured on May 10, 2022, and placed on injured reserve. He was released with an injury settlement on June 10, 2022.

References

External links
Houston Cougars bio

1995 births
Living people
People from Bryan, Texas
Players of American football from Texas
American football cornerbacks
American football wide receivers
Houston Cougars football players
Oakland Raiders players
Las Vegas Raiders players
Dallas Cowboys players
Pittsburgh Steelers players
Arizona Cardinals players